Satyrium abdominalis, the Gerhard's black hairstreak, is a butterfly in the family Lycaenidae.

Distribution
The Gerhard's black hairstreak is a common species in Turkey.

Habitat
The Gerhard's black hairstreak prefers bushy rocky slopes and ravines.

References 

Satyrium (butterfly)
Butterflies described in 1850